Hymenopenaeus is a genus of prawns containing 17 species.

Species

 Hymenopenaeus aphoticus Burkenroad, 1936
 Hymenopenaeus chacei Crosnier & Forest, 1969
 Hymenopenaeus debilis Smith, 1882
 Hymenopenaeus doris Faxon, 1893
 Hymenopenaeus equalis Spence Bate, 1888
 Hymenopenaeus fallax Crosnier & Dall, 2004
 Hymenopenaeus fattahi Ramadan, 1938
 Hymenopenaeus furici Crosnier, 1978
 Hymenopenaeus halli Bruce, 1966
 Hymenopenaeus laevis Spence Bate, 1881
 Hymenopenaeus methalli Crosnier & Dall, 2004
 Hymenopenaeus neptunus Spence Bate, 1881
 Hymenopenaeus nereus Faxon, 1893
 Hymenopenaeus obliquirostris Spence Bate, 1881
 Hymenopenaeus propinquus de Man, 1907
 Hymenopenaeus sewelli Ramadan, 1938
 Hymenopenaeus tuerkayi Crosnier, 1995

References

Decapod genera
Taxa named by Sidney Irving Smith

Solenoceridae